Bank One Mauritius is a full service commercial bank based in Mauritius and jointly owned by CIEL Finance Limited and I&M Group PLC.

The CIEL group owns 75% of CIEL Finance, and Amethis Finance Corporation, which manages investment funds for the African continent, owns the other 25%.

CIEL is one of the largest groups in Mauritius, with operations in 10 countries and 35,000 employees. The group is publicly listed in Mauritius.

I&M has interests in banking, insurance, manufacturing, and real estate and has operations in Kenya, Tanzania, Uganda, Rwanda and Mauritius. The group is listed on the Nairobi Stock Exchange and is one of the oldest publicly owned companies in Kenya.

Bank One has a team of 421 staff and has domestic retail and corporate banking operations and cross border businesses focused on Sub-Saharan Africa, serving the following segments: wealth management, custody, private banking, corporate and financial institutions.

The shareholders of Bank One have interests in banking operations in eight African markets (Kenya, Madagascar, Rwanda, Tanzania, Uganda, Ghana, Ivory Coast and Mauritius) and this provides the Bank with unrivalled access and understanding of business in Sub-Saharan Africa.

Ownership
The stock of the bank is privately owned. The table below depicts the ownership in Bank One Mauritius:

Branches
BOM maintains networked branches at the following locations:

 Main Branch - 16 Sir William Newton Street, Port Louis
 Curepipe Branch - Royal Road, Curepipe
 Rose Hill Branch - Royal Road, Rose Hill
 Rose Belle Branch - Royal Road, Rose Belle
 Vacoas Branch - John Kennedy Avenue, Vacoas
 Quatre Bornes Branch - St Jean Road, A8, Quatre Bornes, Quatre Bornes
 Flacq Branch - Charles de Gaulle Street, Flacq
 Goodlands Branch - Royal Road

See also
 List of banks in Mauritius
 List of banks in Africa
 Bank of Mauritius
 Economy of Mauritius
 I&M Bank Group

References

External links
 List of Main Commercial Banks In Mauritius

2002 establishments in Mauritius
Banks of Mauritius
Banks established in 2002
Companies based in Port Louis
I&M Bank Group